Gmina Białaczów is a rural gmina (administrative district) in Opoczno County, Łódź Voivodeship, in central Poland.

Villages
Gmina Białaczów contains the villages and settlements of Białaczów, Kuraszków, Miedzna Drewniana, Ossa, Parczów, Parczówek, Petrykozy, Radwan, Sędów, Skronina, Sobień, Wąglany, Zakrzów and Żelazowice.

Neighbouring gminas
Gmina Białaczów is bordered by the gminas of Gowarczów, Końskie, Opoczno, Paradyż, Sławno and Żarnów.

References

Polish official population figures 2006

Bialaczow
Opoczno County